Kapil Talwalkar (born March 8, 1993) is an Indian American actor and musician. He is best known for portraying Tobin in NBC's musical dramedy Zoey's Extraordinary Playlist and Neil in the reboot of the sitcom Night Court.

Biography 
Born in India, Talwalkar grew up in Cupertino, California. He has been acting since he was a teenager.

Talwalkar majored in international relations at USC Dornsife. He has a minor at the USC School of Dramatics Arts.

After graduation, he trained in Meisner technique under William Esper at the Esper Studio and Joshua Bitton in Los Angeles.

Career 
Talwalkar launched his professional acting career as a hip origami prodigy in Animals out of Paper, which opened East West Players’ 50th season. In 2018, he was cast in the ABC drama pilot False Profits as a series regular.

He is best known for his main role as Tobin in NBC's Zoey’s Extraordinary Playlist. He reprised the role in the Roku film Zoey’s Extraordinary Christmas. Talwalkar had previously guest-starred in Lifetime's American Princess and also lends his voice to Nickelodeon’s The Loud House. In late 2021, he joined the casts of NBC's Night Court and the reboot of Charmed on The CW.

Talwalkar has also performed in a number of theatrical productions and plays such as Philip Ridley's Radiant Vermin.

Partial filmography

External links 

Kapil Talwalkar - Official Instagram
Kapil Talwalkar - Official Twitter

References 

Living people
American male actors of Indian descent
People from Cupertino, California
1993 births
Male actors from California
Male actors from Pune
Indian emigrants to the United States
University of Southern California alumni
American male television actors
American male voice actors
21st-century American male actors
American male stage actors